The American Legion Hall, Post 32  is a prominent social center in Greybull, Wyoming. Built in 1922 as a temporary church, it became an American Legion hall in 1935. Used as overflow space by nearby schools, it serves a diverse range of functions in the community.

History
The hall was built in 1922 by the Trinity Methodist Episcopal Church as a temporary sanctuary while their new church was built. It later functioned as a social hall for the church. Since it was located in close proximity to town schools, it was used as overflow space. The town used the hall as a polling place until at least 1955. The American Legion bought the building in 1935, after the church congregation abandoned their church project. Although a much larger community center was built by the town with a WPA grant in 1936, the Legion Hall remained popular for smaller gatherings and for events that featured a speaker. Organizations as diverse as the railroad union and the Odd Fellows met there. In later years it was used for day care, until 1995, and used for storage after that. In 2015 work started on plans for rehabilitation of the structure.

Description
The gables are clad in wood shingles, while the body of the building is sheathed in closely lapping clapboards. A tightly arranged grouping of windows flanks the main entrance at the gable end, facing the street on the east side. Five evenly spaced windows line the south elevation, and the west elevation is blank except for a small window in the gable. The main hall is about twelve feet in height and was originally covered in lath and plaster. Poor structural performance of the original scissor trusses led to the installation of columns in the main hall to support the roof.

Post 32 of the American Legion was placed on the National Register of Historic Places on June 24, 2014.

References

External links
 American Legion Hall at the Wyoming State Historic Preservation Office
 American Legion Post 32 at the National Park Service

External links
 Mountain View Hotel at the Wyoming State Historic Preservation Office

National Register of Historic Places in Big Horn County, Wyoming
Buildings and structures completed in 1922
Buildings and structures in Big Horn County, Wyoming
American Legion buildings
1922 establishments in Wyoming